Stephen Custer is a cellist who performs as a soloist and as a regular member of the Los Angeles Philharmonic, the premier orchestra of Southern California, in Los Angeles, California.

"He has performed solos with numerous orchestras and chamber music ensembles, including the Westlake (CA) Chamber Ensemble, Amici Musicae and Philharmonic ensembles and has given many recitals in California and in the eastern US. As a member of the Philharmonic, Stephen has played over 4000 concerts under four Music Directors at the Dorothy Chandler Pavilion, the new Walt Disney Concert Hall, Hollywood Bowl," and on tour.

Custer, who is from Newton, Massachusetts, studied at Juilliard School, did graduate work at Ohio University and earned a Doctor of Musical Arts in cello at Catholic University in Washington, D.C.

He became the principal cellist of the Syracuse Symphony Orchestra in Syracuse, New York, in 1971.

He joined the Los Angeles Philharmonic in 1974.

He is an adjunct professor of cello at Pepperdine University.

References

Ohio University alumni
Pepperdine University faculty
American classical cellists
Living people
Catholic University of America alumni
Year of birth missing (living people)